, also known as , is a Japanese dish consisting of a bowl of rice topped with beef and onion simmered in a mildly sweet sauce flavored with dashi (fish and seaweed stock), soy sauce and mirin (sweet rice wine). It may sometimes also be served with toppings such as raw or soft poached eggs, Welsh onions (negi), grated cheese or kimchi. A popular food in Japan, it is commonly eaten with beni shōga (pickled ginger), shichimi (ground chili pepper), and a side dish of miso soup.

History 

After the arrival of Buddhism in Japan in the 6th century, consumption of meat became rare in Japanese culture (especially those of four-footed animals such as beef or pork) and in many cases frowned upon, both for religious and practical reasons. It was only after the Meiji Restoration in 1868 and the subsequent westernization of the country that meat began to be widely eaten.

Gyūdon is considered to be derived from gyūnabe (牛鍋), a beef hot pot originating in the Kantō region of eastern Japan. Gyūnabe originally consisted of cuts of beef simmered with Welsh onions and miso (as the beef available in Japan at the time were usually of poor quality, the meat was cooked this way to tenderize it and neutralize its foul smell), but by the late 1800s, a variation that used a special stock called warishita (割下) - a combination of a sweetener such as sugar or mirin and soy sauce - instead of miso and featuring additional ingredients such as shirataki (konjac cut into noodle-like strips) and tofu began to appear. This version of gyūnabe (known today as sukiyaki - originally the name of a similar yet distinct dish from the Kansai region) eventually came to be served with rice in a deep bowl (donburi), becoming gyūmeshi or gyūdon. 

By the 1890s, gyūmeshi had already become popular in Tokyo, but was yet unknown in other places such as Kyoto or Osaka. In 1899, Eikichi Matsuda opened the first Yoshinoya restaurant, at the fish market in Tokyo's Nihonbashi district. Gyūdon, under the moniker kamechabu, were also being sold in food stands (yatai) in the streets of Ueno and Asakusa.

Originally disparaged as working-class food, gyūdon experienced a surge in popularity that transcended class boundaries in the aftermath of the Great Kantō Earthquake of 1923, when it was one of the food items readily available to the citizens of a devastated Tokyo. It was around this time that gyūdon evolved further into its present form: a bowl of rice topped with thin slices of beef with onions (tamanegi).

Although some establishments still offer gyūdon with a sukiyaki-like topping (i.e. containing ingredients such as shirataki or tofu), the dish as served in most major food chains nowadays simply consist of rice, beef and onions.

As fast food 

Gyūdon can be found in many restaurants in Japan, and some fast food chains specialize exclusively in the dish. Many of these chain shops are open round the clock. The top three gyūdon chains in Japan are Sukiya (currently the largest gyūdon chain in Japan, established in Yokohama in 1981), Yoshinoya (the oldest and second largest, established in the Nihonbashi district of what is now Chūō, Tokyo in 1899), and Matsuya (established in Nerima, Tokyo in 1968).

Some of these establishments might refer to gyūdon by other names: Matsuya for instance sells gyūdon under the name gyūmeshi (牛めし), while Hanamaru Udon (はなまるうどん), a chain specializing mainly in Sanuki udon (currently a subsidiary of Yoshinoya), includes what it calls gyūniku gohan (牛肉ごはん, lit. "beef rice") in its menu.

While many establishments charge for miso soup or offer it as a part of a set, Matsuya is known for serving complimentary miso soup for customers who are eating in.

Customer specifications 

There are chains that allow customers to specify how their gyūdon is served with code phrases like tsuyudaku (extra tsuyu broth) at no extra charge. 

Tsuyudaku, in regards to gyūdon, is jargon that refers to one kind of specification where the juice and tsuyu mixture is served in large amounts.  Tsuyunuki is where the amount of tsuyu is specified to be less than usual. Also, the term tsuyudakudaku is code for a larger amount of tsuyu.

Sometimes, as with tsuyudakudakudaku ("dripping with soupiness"), people will request that the daku, or amount of tsuyu, be exceedingly increased.

One theory says that daku comes from the taku part of takusan ("many, a lot") which, when doubled as in daku-daku, is also the onomatopoeia (imitative word) for the sound of dripping.

The origin of tsuyudaku comes from Japanese businessmen (salaryman) on their morning commute to work who, due to time restrictions, ask for extra soupy gyūdon (gyūdon tsuyu ome ni) so that they can eat it quickly.

This trend became so common, that the term tsuyudaku quickly spread among proprietors of popular gyūdon chains.

Beef ban 
As a consequence of the fear of mad cow disease and a ban on imports of beef from the United States, Yoshinoya and most competitors were forced to terminate gyūdon sales in Japan on February 11, 2004. Yoshinoya moved its business to a similar dish made with pork instead of beef, which it named butadon (豚丼). Sukiya continued to serve gyūdon (using Australian beef) and also added a dish, tondon, equivalent to Yoshinoya's butadon, to its menu. (Buta and ton are both Japanese words for pig or pork, written with the same Kanji, 豚. See tonkatsu, tonjiru.)

The Japanese Diet voted to resume beef imports from the United States in early May 2005, but the ban was reinstated in January 2006 after detectable quantities of prohibited spine tissue were found in the first post-ban shipments arriving in Japan. As the issue was discussed between the United States and Japanese governments, gyūdon vendors and customers waited for a resolution. As of September 2006, the ban has been lifted.

See also
Donburi
Sukiyaki
Katsudon
Oyakodon
Japanese curry
Matsuya
Sukiya
Yoshinoya

References

External links 

 Everyday Japanese Cooking

Donburi
Japanese beef dishes
Japanese rice dishes
Fast food